General Carlson may refer to:

Bruce A. Carlson (born 1949), U.S. Air Force four-star general
Evans Carlson (1896–1947), U.S. Marine Corps brigadier general
John Carlson (sportscaster) (1933–2016), Massachusetts Army National Guard brigadier general